Sushma Swaraj (née Sharma; 14 February 1952 – 6 August 2019) was an Indian lawyer, politician, and diplomat who served as the Minister of External Affairs of India in the first Narendra Modi government from 2014 to 2019. She is only the second person to complete the 5-year term as Minister of External Affairs after Jawaharlal Nehru. Being a senior leader of Bharatiya Janata Party, she was the second woman to hold the office, after Indira Gandhi. She was elected seven times as a Member of Parliament and three times as a Member of the Legislative Assembly. At the age of 25 in 1977, she became the youngest cabinet minister of the Indian state of Haryana. She also served as 5th Chief Minister of Delhi for a short duration in 1998 and became the first female Chief Minister of Delhi.

In the 2014 Indian general election, Swaraj won the Vidisha constituency in Madhya Pradesh for a second term, retaining her seat by a margin of over 400,000 votes. She became the Minister of External Affairs in the union cabinet on 26 May 2014. Swaraj was called India's "best-loved politician" by the US daily Wall Street Journal. She decided not to contest the 2019 Indian general election due to health reasons as she was recovering from a kidney transplant and needed to "save herself from dust and stay safe from infection" and hence did not join the second Modi Ministry in 2019.

According to the doctors at AIIMS New Delhi, Swaraj succumbed to a cardiac arrest following a heart attack on the night of 6 August 2019. She was awarded the  Padma Vibhushan, India's second highest civilian award posthumously in 2020 in the field of Public Affairs.

Early life and education
Sushma Swaraj (née Sharma) was born on 14 February 1952 at Ambala Cantonment, Haryana, into a Punjabi Brahmin family, to Hardev Sharma and Shrimati Laxmi Devi. Her father was a prominent Rashtriya Swayamsevak Sangh member. Her parents hailed from the Dharampura area of Lahore, Pakistan. She was educated at Sanatan Dharma College in Ambala Cantonment and earned a bachelor's degree with majors in Sanskrit and Political Science. She studied law at Panjab University, Chandigarh. A state-level competition held by the Language Department of Haryana saw her winning the best Hindi Speaker award for three consecutive years. Sushma Swaraj was a strict vegetarian.

Advocacy career
In 1973, Swaraj started practice as an advocate in the Supreme Court of India. She began her political career with Akhil Bharatiya Vidyarthi Parishad in the 1970s. Her husband, Swaraj Kaushal, was closely associated with the socialist leader George Fernandes and Sushma Swaraj became a part of George Fernandes's legal defence team in 1975. She actively participated in Jayaprakash Narayan's Total Revolution Movement. After the Emergency, she joined the Bharatiya Janata Party. Later, she became a national leader of the BJP.

Political career

Early political career
She was a member of the Haryana Legislative Assembly from 1977 to 1982, winning the Ambala Cantonment assembly seat at the age of 25; and then, again from 1987 to 1990. In July 1977, she was sworn in as a Cabinet Minister in the Janata Party Government headed by then Chief Minister Devi Lal. She held the Labour and Employment ministries from 1977 to 1979. Later she became Minister of Education, Food and Civil supplies during 1987 to 1990. She became State President of the Janata Party (Haryana) in 1979, at the age of 27. She was Education Minister of Haryana state in the Bharatiya Janata Party–Lok Dal coalition government from 1987 to 1990.

In April 1990, she was elected as a member of the Rajya Sabha and remained there until she was elected to the 11th Lok Sabha from South Delhi constituency in 1996. Swaraj was elected to the 11th Lok Sabha from the South Delhi constituency in the April 1996 elections.

Minister of Information and Broadcasting (1996)
She served as Union Cabinet Minister for Information and Broadcasting during the 13-day government of PM Atal Bihari Vajpayee in 1996.

Chief Minister of Delhi (1998)

After a tenure in national level politics, she resigned from the Union Cabinet in October 1998 to take over as the fifth Chief Minister of Delhi. She became the first female Chief Minister of Delhi. Swaraj resigned from the position in December the same year.

Minister of Information and Broadcasting (2000–2003) 
She was re-elected to the 12th Lok Sabha from South Delhi Parliamentary constituency for a second term, in March 1998. Under the second PM Vajpayee Government, she was sworn in as Union Cabinet Minister for Information and Broadcasting with an additional charge of the Ministry of Telecommunications from 19 March 1998 to 12 October 1998. Her most notable decision during this period was to declare film production as an industry, which made the Indian film industry eligible for bank finance. She also started community radio at universities and other institutions.

In September 1999, Swaraj was nominated by the BJP to contest against the Congress party's national President Sonia Gandhi in the 13th Lok Sabha election, from the Bellary constituency in Karnataka, which had always been retained by Congress politicians since the first Indian general election in 1951–52. During her campaign in Bellary, she addressed public meetings in the Kannada. She secured  votes in just 12 days of her election campaign. However, she lost the election by a 7% margin.

She returned to Parliament in April 2000 as a Rajya Sabha member from Uttar Pradesh. She was reallocated to Uttrakhand when the new state was carved out of Uttar Pradesh on 9 November 2000. She was inducted into the Union Cabinet as Minister for Information and Broadcasting, a position she held from September 2000 until January 2003.

Minister of Health & Family Welfare(2003–2004)

She was Minister of Health, Family Welfare and Parliamentary Affairs from January 2003 until May 2004, when the National Democratic Alliance Government lost the general election.

As Union Health Minister, she set up six All India Institute of Medical Sciences at Bhopal (MP), Bhubaneshwar (Odisha), Jodhpur (Rajasthan), Patna (Bihar), Raipur (Chhattisgarh) and Rishikesh (Uttrakhand).

Swaraj was re-elected to the Rajya Sabha for a third term in April 2006 from Madhya Pradesh state. She served as the Deputy leader of Opposition in Rajya Sabha until April 2009.

Leader of Opposition, Lok Sabha (2009–2014)
She won the 2009 election for the 15th Lok Sabha from the Vidisha Lok Sabha constituency in Madhya Pradesh by the highest margin of over  votes. Sushma Swaraj became Leader of Opposition in the 15th Lok Sabha in place of Lal Krishna Advani on 21 December 2009, and retained this position until May 2014 when, in the 2014 Indian general election, her party won a major victory.

Minister of External Affairs (2014–2019) 

Swaraj had served as the Indian Minister of External Affairs under Prime Minister Narendra Modi from May 2014 to May 2019. She was responsible for implementing the foreign policy of Narendra Modi. She was only the second woman to hold this position after Indira Gandhi.

While being the Minister of External Affairs of the NDA government, Swaraj issued an NOC against a specific query raised by the UK government about the Indo-UK bilateral relationship if the UK granted permission to Lalit Modi, an Indian fugitive in a cricket scandal who had been staying in Britain since 2010, to attend his wife's surgery in Portugal. She conveyed to the British High Commissioner that they should examine Modi's request as per their rules and wrote "if the British government chooses to give travel documents to Lalit Modi -– that will not spoil our bilateral relations". However, some people mentioned this incident as Swaraj helping Lalit Modi in the travel visa process.

On 12 August 2015, the leader of the Indian National Congress, Mallikarjun Kharge, moved an Adjournment Motion in the lower house seeking the resignation of Sushma Swaraj due to her alleged conduct in this regard. Initially, the motion was rejected by the Speaker, but it was accepted on Swaraj's insistence. Intervening in the motion, Swaraj clarified that Lalit Modi's right of residency was not cancelled, since the Enforcement Directorate did not file an extradition request. The Adjournment Motion was subsequently rejected with a voice vote.
Sushma Swaraj was heavily criticised in 2014 when she urged Prime Minister Modi to declare the Bhagavad Gita as the national book of India.

As External Affairs Minister, she played a pivotal role in bringing back the then 23-year-old hearing and speech-impaired Indian girl named Gita who was stranded in Pakistan for 15 years.

Distinctions and records
In 1977, she became the youngest ever Cabinet Minister in the Government of Haryana at 25 years of age. In 1979, she became State President of Janata Party, Haryana State at the young age of 27. Sushma Swaraj was the first female Spokesperson of a national political party in India. She has many firsts to her credit as BJP's first female Chief Minister, Union Cabinet Minister, general secretary, Spokesperson, Leader of Opposition and Minister of External Affairs. She is the Indian Parliament's first and the only female MP honoured with the Outstanding Parliamentarian Award. She has contested 11 direct elections from four states. She has served as the President of the Hindi Sahitya Sammelan in Haryana for four years.

In February 2016, during the International Roma Conference, then Indian Minister of External Affairs, Sushma Swaraj stated that the people of the Roma community were children of India. The conference ended with a recommendation to the government of India to recognize the Roma community spread across 30 countries as a part of the Indian diaspora.

On 19 February 2019 Swaraj accepted the prestigious Grand Cross of Order of Civil Merit, which was conferred by the Spanish government in recognition of India's support in evacuating its citizens from Nepal during the earthquake in 2015.

Personal life
During the times of the Emergency, on 13 July 1975, Sushma Sharma married Swaraj Kaushal, a peer and fellow advocate at the Supreme Court of India. The Emergency movement brought together the couple, who then teamed up for the defence of the socialist leader George Fernandes. Swaraj Kaushal, a senior advocate of Supreme Court of India and a criminal lawyer, also served as Governor of Mizoram from 1990 to 1993. He was a member of parliament from 1998 to 2004.

The couple have a daughter, Bansuri, who is a graduate from Oxford University and a Barrister at Law from Inner Temple.

Sushma Swaraj's sister Vandana Sharma is an associate professor of political science in a government college for girls in Haryana. Her brother Dr. Gulshan Sharma is an Ayurveda doctor based in Ambala.

On 10 December 2016 she underwent a kidney transplant at AIIMS, Delhi with the organ being harvested from a living unrelated donor. The surgery was reported to be successful.

Death
On 6 August 2019, Sushma Swaraj reportedly suffered a heart attack in the evening after which she was rushed to AIIMS New Delhi, where she later died of a cardiac arrest. She was cremated the next day with full state honours at the Lodhi crematorium in Delhi.

Positions held
 1977–82 Elected as Member, Haryana Legislative Assembly.
 1977–79 Cabinet Minister, Labour and Employment, Government of Haryana.
 1987–90 Elected as Member, Haryana Legislative Assembly.
 1987–90 Cabinet Minister, Education, Food and Civil Supplies, Government of Haryana.
1991–1996 Member of Rajya Sabha
 1996 [16 May – 1 June] – Union Cabinet Minister, Information and Broadcasting.
 2000–06 Member, Rajya Sabha (4th term).
 2006–09 [April 2006 -] Member, Rajya Sabha (5th term).
 2009–14 [16 May 2009 – 18 May 2014] Member, 15th Lok Sabha (6th term).
 2009-09 [3 June 2009 – 21 December 2009] Deputy Leader of the Opposition in the Lok Sabha.
 2009–2014 [21 December 2009 – 26 May 2014] Leader of Opposition in the Lok Sabha.
 2014–2019 [26 May 2014 – 24 May 2019] Member, 16th Lok Sabha (7th term).
 2014–2019 [26 May 2014 – 29 May 2019] Minister of External Affairs in the Union of India.

Awards and honours

State honours
:
Padma Vibhushan (posthumously) (2020)
:
Grand Cross of the Order of Civil Merit (19 February 2019)

Places named after her
 In 2020, Government of India renamed Foreign Service Institute of India after her as Sushma Swaraj Institute of Foreign Service.
 In 2020, Government of India renamed Pravasi Bharatiya Kendra after her as Sushma Swaraj Bhawan.
 The bus station of Ambala City is named after her in 2020.

See also
List of foreign ministers in 2017
List of current foreign ministers

References

External links

MEA : Profile of Minister of External Affairs
Detailed Profile: Smt. Sushma Swaraj
Official Biographical Sketch in Lok Sabha Website

1952 births
2019 deaths
India MPs 1996–1997
India MPs 1998–1999
India MPs 2009–2014
India MPs 2014–2019
20th-century Indian lawyers
20th-century Indian women politicians
20th-century Indian politicians
21st-century Indian women politicians
21st-century Indian politicians
Bharatiya Janata Party politicians
Chief ministers from Bharatiya Janata Party
Chief Ministers of Delhi
Female foreign ministers
Health ministers of India
Women chief ministers of Indian states
Janata Party politicians
Leaders of the Opposition (India)
Lok Sabha members from Delhi
Lok Sabha members from Madhya Pradesh
Ministers for External Affairs of India
Ministers for Information and Broadcasting of India
Panjab University alumni
People from Ambala
People from Delhi
Punjabi people
Rajya Sabha members from Haryana
Rajya Sabha members from Uttarakhand
State cabinet ministers of Haryana
Women members of the Cabinet of India
Women in Delhi politics
Women members of the Haryana Legislative Assembly
Rajya Sabha members from Madhya Pradesh
Indian women diplomats
Members of the National Cadet Corps (India)
Narendra Modi ministry
Indian Hindus
Recipients of the Padma Vibhushan in public affairs
20th-century Indian women lawyers
Haryana MLAs 1977–1982
Haryana MLAs 1987–1991
Women members of the Rajya Sabha
Women members of the Lok Sabha